Chattergala Tunnel, is an under Construction road tunnel in Jammu and Kashmir union territory of India.
The tunnel will be 6.8 km long and will connect Kathua and Doda districts of Jammu and Kashmir via Basohli-Bani through Chattergala. 
The tunnel is expected to be completed in about 4 years and its construction cost is around Rs. 3,000 crore.

The tunnel will facilitate all-weather road connectivity between the two distant regions Doda and Kathua of Jammu and Kashmir.
After completion of this tunnel, the travel time from Lakhanpur to Doda would be reduced to four hours.

See also
 Jawahar Tunnel
 Banihal Qazigund Road Tunnel
 Nandni tunnels
 Pir Panjal Railway Tunnel
 Zoji-la Tunnel
 Z-Morh Tunnel
 Atal Tunnel

References

Road tunnels in Jammu and Kashmir
Proposed road tunnels in Asia
Proposed road infrastructure in India
Kathua district
Doda district
Buildings and structures under construction in India